Nicotinamide N-methyltransferase (NNMT) is an enzyme that in humans is encoded by the NNMT gene.  NNMT catalyzes the methylation of nicotinamide and similar compounds using the methyl donor S-adenosyl methionine (SAM-e) to produce S-adenosyl-L-homocysteine (SAH) and 1-methylnicotinamide.

Function
Methylation of nicotinamide by NNMT and SAM-e is the major pathway for degradation of nicotinamide leading to excretion in the urine.

Clinical significance
NNMT is highly expressed in the human liver. N-methylation is one method by which drug and other xenobiotic compounds are metabolized by the liver. NNMT expression in adipose tissue is associated with obesity and insulin resistance. Contrary to the negative effects of increased NNMT in adipose tissue, increased NNMT in liver is associated with a better metabolic profile, namely reduced serum triglycerides and free fatty acids. In adipose tissue, NNMT can lead to methylation depletion, whereas because of the many methylation enzymes in the liver NNMT has a negligible effect on liver methylation. But in the liver, the 1-methylnicotinamide produced by NNMT degradation of nicotinamide increases sirtuin 1 (SIRT1) by inhibiting degradation of that protein. Overexpression of SIRT1 in mice has been shown to reduce insulin and fasting glucose, as well as increased metabolism and physical function.

Abundant availability of nicotinamide leads to depletion of both nicotinamide adenine dinucleotide (NAD+) and SAM-e, resulting in liver steatosis and fibrosis, causing the progression from non-alcoholic fatty liver disease (NAFLD) to non-alcoholic steatohepatitis (NASH).

Human embryonic stem cells expression of NNMT is believed to help maintain the cells in a naive state.

NNMT expression is significantly upregulated in many cancers, including pancreatic cancer where levels of NNMT enzyme correlate with increased risk of death. The cause of these correlations has not been established, but may be related to the fact that NNMT enzyme is an inhibitor of DNA repair.  NNMT and 1-methylnicotinamide inhibit autophagy in breast cancer, protecting breast cancer cells against oxidative stress. NNMT has been suggested to be a biomarker of cancer.

References

Further reading